"Naked" is a song recorded by American recording artist Dev and Spanish recording artist Enrique Iglesias. The song was released as the third single from Dev's debut album The Night the Sun Came Up (2011) on December 20, 2011.

Background
Naked serves as the third single from Dev's debut album The Night the Sun Came Up for its American release. It's a duet with Latin Pop singer Enrique Iglesias. The song was written by Dev herself along with Dev's longtime collaborators The Cataracs, Niles Hollowel-Dhar & David Singer-Vine, who also produced the track. Dev stated in an interview with AOL Music, "Enrique really made the record amazing, he added just the right amount of sexy and of course sounded great! Working with him was an awesome experience, shout out to all my fellow Latinas y Latinos out there!" Its chorus includes both the singers singing, "So I don’t care what they say it’s our life, life, life / We can dance if we want make it feel alright / Temperature’s rising I feel on fire / Tonight it’s just me and you". Dev breaks up & sings, "Tell me, baby, will you be here when I wake up, even with no makeup, I don’t wanna fake it" followed by Enrique, "and you don’t gotta doubt a second if I miss you, every time I’m with you, I feel naked". There is also a version of this song with R&B singer-songwriter T-Pain instead of Enrique Iglesias. Dev first announced that Naked will be the third single from her debut album by posting the artwork of the song on her official Facebook page on December 10, 2011. The same day it was uploaded to YouTube for fans to get a preview of the song. Since then the video has generated over 24 million views. The song also debuted at No. #1 on iTunes Mexico.

Critical reception
The song has received critical acclaim with critics praising Dev & Enrique's vocals and also the dance-beats.
Amy Sciarretto from Pop-Crush gave the song 3.5 stars (out of 5) quoting, "Dev‘s honeyed, cavity-causing voice snakes and slithers around Enrique Iglesias‘ on their sultry duet, ‘Naked.’ The song will have your blood surging through your veins and to your nether regions. It's a Eurodance-inspired club banger, with thumping backbeats and synths, but the heat generated by the new mom and the Latin pop star? That's as authentic as it gets. If it was Dev's and ‘Rique’s intention to get people hot and bothered by their song, starting things off on the dance floor and finishing them in the bedroom, then mission accomplished. It’s an upbeat, uptempo rump-shaker." Meena Rupani from the Desihits quoted, "Enrique's sultry vocals do well with Dev's ability to talk dirty and make it sound oh so good. The techno elements of the song is what Dev has come to be known for in her tracks so I'm not surprised she has incorporated that here also. Although, I prefer Dev's other tracks this collaboration was good in theory so I suppose a pat on the back can be given to both singers."

Music video
The video was filmed in late February 2012 by director BBGun, the same who directed Enrique Iglesias video for "Tonight (I'm Lovin' You)". It was uploaded to Dev's official VEVO account on March 29, 2012. The video revolves around night life of Las Vegas where Dev and Enrique shown engaging in various activities from gambling to cruising in the clubs and streets.

Track listing
 Digital download
 "Naked" – 3:58

 Promotional CD single
 "Naked" – 3:58
 "Naked" (Tempo Mix) - 4:13
 "Naked" (R3hab Remix) - 4:21
 "Naked" (Static Revenger Remix) - 5:38
 "Naked" (MK Remix) - 5:23
 "Naked" (Trevor Simpson Remix) - 4:22

 Record Store Day 7" vinyl
 "Naked" – 3:58
 "Naked" (R3hab Remix) - 4:12

Charts

Year-end charts

Radio and release history

Radio adds

Purchasable release

References

External links

2011 singles
Dev (singer) songs
Enrique Iglesias songs
Eurodance songs
Male–female vocal duets
Song recordings produced by the Cataracs
2011 songs
Songs written by Kshmr
Songs written by David Singer-Vine
Songs written by Dev (singer)
Songs written by Enrique Iglesias